Lake Fehér in Hungary, near Szeged
Lake Fehér in Hungary, near Kardoskút